Parborlasia is a genus of nemerteans belonging to the family Lineidae.

The species of this genus are found in southernmost South Hemisphere.

Species:

Parborlasia corrugatus 
Parborlasia dahli 
Parborlasia fueguina 
Parborlasia hutchingsae 
Parborlasia landrumae

References

Lineidae
Nemertea genera